Rozelle Ivory Gayle (February 24, 1919 – December 6, 1986) was an American jazz pianist, comic entertainer and actor.

Biography
Born in Chicago, he studied at the American Conservatory of Music before working as a pianist with Roy Eldridge's band, recording with them in 1943.  A follower of Art Tatum, he moved to southern California in 1948, and started performing as a solo act in clubs.  In 1953, he had a residency in Santa Ana, California.  A review in Jet magazine described his "boogie-to-Bach repertoire" and claimed he was being hailed as "the new Fats Waller".  He recorded several tracks for the Combo label in the mid-1950s, including some using the name Paul Preston.

In 1958, he recorded the album Like, Be My Guest – An Evening With Rozelle Gayle for Mercury Records.  The album combined jazz with hipster comedy.  He also recorded with Benny Carter in 1964. He released a second album, Sex Cracks on the Dooto label in 1967; the album was promoted as "America's maddest album yet", containing "super sidesplitting sex-humor galore!"  Gayle also acted in many movies, including The Devil's Daughter (1973), Coast to Coast, The Man with Bogart's Face (both 1980), and  Honkytonk Man (1982).

He died of cancer in Los Angeles in 1986, aged 67.

Filmography

Discography
 Like, Be My Guest (Mercury, 1958)
 Sex Cracks (Dooto, 1967)

References
 7. Demetria Fulton previewed Rozelle Gayle in Barnaby Jones; episode titled, "The Lonely Victims"(01/08/1976).

1919 births
1986 deaths
Musicians from Chicago
American jazz pianists
American male pianists
Jazz musicians from Illinois
20th-century American male musicians
American male jazz musicians
20th-century American pianists